Advance for NPs & PAs is a peer-reviewed nursing journal covering the practices of nurse practitioners and physician assistants. It is the official journal of the Association of Family Practice Physician Assistants and the National Association of Dermatology Nurse Practitioners. The journal was established in 2010 as the result of a merger between Advance for Nurse Practitioners and Advance for Physician Assistants, which were both published from April 1993 to August 2010. The journal offers free subscriptions and is abstracted and indexed in MEDLINE/PubMed.

References

External links 
 
 Association of Family Practice Physician Assistants
 National Association of Dermatology Nurse Practitioners

English-language journals
General nursing journals
Monthly journals
Publications established in 2010